Tatabánya is a district in south-eastern part of Komárom-Esztergom County. Tatabánya is also the name of the town where the district seat is found. The district is located in the Central Transdanubia Statistical Region.

Geography 
Tatabánya District borders with Tata District and Esztergom District to the north, Budakeszi District (Pest County) to the east, Bicske District (Fejér County) to the east and south, Oroszlány District to the west. The number of the inhabited places in Tatabánya District is 10.

Municipalities 
The district has 1 urban county and 9 villages.
(ordered by population, as of 1 January 2013)

The bolded municipality is the city.

Demographics

In 2011, it had a population of 85,691 and the population density was 131/km².

Ethnicity
Besides the Hungarian majority, the main minorities are the German (approx. 3,900), Roma (1,400), Slovak (450) and Romanian (250).

Total population (2011 census): 85,691
Ethnic groups (2011 census): Identified themselves: 78,453 persons:
Hungarians: 71,561 (91.22%)
Germans: 3,883 (4.95%)
Gypsies: 1,323 (1.69%)
Others and indefinable: 1,686 (2.15%)
Approx. 7,000 persons in Tatabánya District did not declare their ethnic group at the 2011 census.

Religion
Religious adherence in the county according to 2011 census:

Catholic – 25,106 (Roman Catholic – 24,726; Greek Catholic – 375);
Reformed – 5,560;
Evangelical – 809; 
other religions – 1,230; 
Non-religious – 25,470; 
Atheism – 1,620;
Undeclared – 25,896.

See also
List of cities and towns in Hungary

References

External links
 Postal codes of the Tatabánya District

Districts in Komárom-Esztergom County